Transatlantic Merry-Go-Round is a 1934 American drama film with musical and comedic elements, directed by Benjamin Stoloff.

Plot
Gangster Lee Lother (Sidney Blackmer) is shot and killed during an ocean liner cruise, and we're introduced in flashback to the interwoven stories and characters of the suspects:  con-man and jewel-thief Jimmy Brett and his accomplice, a wife who bids goodbye to her husband without realizing he'll stowaway to spy on her, the star of the ship's entertainment revue and her brother with gambling debts, and the Inspector who interrupts his vacation to solve the case.

The film's many musical numbers include a Busby Berkeley-like number with chorus girls in geometric patterns filmed from overhead. A song performed by The Boswell Sisters titled "Rock and Roll", written by Richard A. Whiting and Sidney Clare, is sometimes credited as the first use of that term in a popular song, although in this case the lyrics referred to the motion of the ocean.

Cast 
 Gene Raymond as Jimmy Brett
 Nancy Carroll as Sally Marsh
 Jack Benny as Chad Denby
 Sydney Howard as Dan Campbell, the Drunk
 Mitzi Green as Mitzi
 Sid Silvers as Shorty
 Frank Parker as Frank, the Tenor
 Sidney Blackmer as Lee Lother
 Ralph Morgan as Herbert Rosson
 Shirley Grey as Anya Rosson
 Patsy Kelly as Patsy Clarke
 Sam Hardy as Jack Summers
 William 'Stage' Boyd as Joe Saunders
 Robert Elliott as Inspector 'Mac' McKinney
 The Boswell Sisters as themselves 
 Allan Cavan as Ship's Officer (uncredited)
 André Cheron as Frenchman (uncredited)
 Wallis Clark as Ship's Captain (uncredited)
 Don Douglas as Purser (uncredited)
 Bess Flowers as Woman in Audience (uncredited)
 Mary Forbes as Passenger (uncredited)
 Esther Howard as Passenger (uncredited)
 Wilfred Lucas as Policeman at Dock (uncredited)
 Tom McGuire as Detective (uncredited)
 Wedgwood Nowell as Waiter (uncredited)
 Dennis O'Keefe as Passenger Watching Revue (uncredited)
 Lee Phelps as Porter at Dock (uncredited)
 Syd Saylor as Campbell's Taxi Driver (uncredited)
 Larry Steers as Passenger Asked to Get Purser (uncredited)

Production
London comic Sydney Howard was imported to star. The original title was London Showboat or Showboat of 1934.

References

External links  
  
 Turner Classic Movies page

1934 films
American black-and-white films
United Artists films
Films directed by Benjamin Stoloff
Films produced by Edward Small
American musical comedy-drama films
1930s musical comedy-drama films
1930s mystery comedy-drama films
American mystery comedy-drama films
1934 drama films
1934 comedy films
1930s English-language films
1930s American films